José Carlos Cancela Durán (born June 25, 1976) is a Uruguayan retired footballer who played as an attacking midfielder. He is nicknamed "Pepe".

Before joining the Colorado Rapids, Cancela played the preseason with Toronto FC but was traded to the Denver-based club the day before the regular season began. Cancela played for Peñarol,  Cruz Azul, Deportivo Saprissa, and the New England Revolution. He had to leave Saprissa, despite being loved by their fans, because of the rule implemented by the "Morados" after 2003, by which they could only use Costa Rican players in their team.

Cancela joined the Revolution in July 2003, and immediately added an attacking flair not often seen in MLS.  He immediately slotted into the starting lineup, and finished the season with a goal and seven assists in 13 games.  Cancela struggled a little in his second year, as Clint Dempsey emerged as a competitor for the attacking midfield position, but finished the year with three goals and ten assists in 25 games. He scored two goals and five assists in 2005.

After the 2006 season, Cancela was taken by Toronto FC in the 2006 MLS Expansion Draft, but dealt to the Colorado Rapids in April of the following year in exchange for a Youth International slot to be held by Toronto until 2009.  He was waived by the Rapids before the 2008 season.

External links
 
 BDFA profile
 

1976 births
Living people
People from Santa Lucía, Uruguay
Uruguayan footballers
Cruz Azul footballers
Peñarol players
New England Revolution players
Colorado Rapids players
Club Puebla players
C.S. Herediano footballers
Deportivo Saprissa players
Centro Atlético Fénix players
Expatriate footballers in Mexico
Expatriate soccer players in the United States
Expatriate footballers in Costa Rica
Uruguayan Primera División players
Liga MX players
Major League Soccer players
Liga FPD players
Association football midfielders